Adolfo Alamiro Olivares Aravena  (born 20 December 1940) is a Chilean former footballer who played as a striker. Besides Chile, he played in El Salvador and Bolivia.

Club career
As a youth player, Olivares was with club Estrella de Ocoa. At a professional level, he mainly developed his career in the Chilean top division. He made his professional debut with Everton de Viña del Mar in 1961. After two seasons with Ferrobádminton, he joined Universidad de Chile in 1964, taking part in the well-known squad known as El Ballet Azul, staying with them for three seasons. In his homeland at the top division, he also played for Palestino, Huachipato, Santiago Morning, Audax Italiano and Magallanes.

Abroad, he played for Alianza in El Salvador and both The Strongest and Aurora in Bolivia. With The Strongest, he won the league title in 1974 and took part in the 1975 Copa Libertadores.

His last club was Unión San Felipe in the 1979 season.

Following his retirement, he went on playing football at the amateur level in leagues such as Liga La Reina from Huechuraba and Liga Independiente de Fútbol from Santiago.

International career
Olivares made fifteen appearances for the Chile national team in friendly matches and the 1970 FIFA World Cup qualifiers and scored seven goals between 1968 and 1969.

Personal life
He is nicknamed Cuchi-Cuchi, a nickname that was given by his fellow footballer Rubén Marcos after he went out with Silvia Ferrer, known by that stage name, an Argentine star from the  theater.

After suffering and getting over lymph node cancer, he was helped by Martín Gálvez, a former player of Universidad de Chile.

References

External links
 
 Adolfo Olivares at SoloFutbol.cl 

1940 births
Living people
People from Quillota Province
Chilean footballers
Chilean expatriate footballers
Chile international footballers
Chilean Primera División players
Everton de Viña del Mar footballers
Badminton F.C. footballers
Universidad de Chile footballers
Club Deportivo Palestino footballers
C.D. Huachipato footballers
Santiago Morning footballers
Audax Italiano footballers
Deportes Magallanes footballers
Magallanes footballers
Salvadoran Primera División players
Alianza F.C. footballers
Bolivian Primera División players
The Strongest players
Club Aurora players
Primera B de Chile players
Unión San Felipe footballers
Chilean expatriate sportspeople in El Salvador
Chilean expatriate sportspeople in Bolivia
Expatriate footballers in El Salvador
Expatriate footballers in Bolivia
Association football forwards